The Liga Nacional de Básquet (abbreviated LNB, and literally in English, "National Basketball League"), also commonly referred to as "La Liga de Básquet" ("The Basketball League"), is the top-tier level of the Argentine basketball league system. The league is under the auspices of the Basketball Clubs' Association (in Spanish: Asociación de Clubes de Básquetbol). The LNB's predecessor league is the now defunct Campeonato Argentino de Clubes, which was organized by the Argentine Basketball Federation.

The league was created through the efforts of basketball coach León Najnudel, and sports journalist Osvaldo Orcasitas, in the 1980s, to make Argentine men's club basketball more competitive, through the merging of the many existing local leagues. It is designed like the NBA, with a regular season, all-star game, and playoffs. However, unlike the NBA, the LNB has a promotion and relegation system, with the La Liga Argentina (LLA), the league level that is immediately below the LNB.

A tribute to Najnudel's vision, is the string of successes of the senior men's Argentine national basketball team, culminating with the team's Summer Olympic Games gold medal won at the 2004 Summer Olympics, and the international careers of many players who started in the league.

History

Creation 

Before the league was established, the regular tournament was Campeonato Argentino de Clubes where teams from all the provinces took part. The league had a regional format and playoffs.

For the 1984 edition there was 64 teams. The association decided to retire 10 teams, moving them to "Primera Nacional A". Of those teams, 4 were from city of Buenos Aires, and the provinces of Buenos Aires, Córdoba and Santa Fe were represented by 2 teams each.

As a result, a number of 54 teams played the Argentino de clubes. At the end of the tournament, the six best placed team would promote to Primera A, and the rest of the clubs would be relegated to Primera B (second division).

First seasons 

The first edition of Liga Nacional was played within 1985, with 16 teams participating although Independiente de Tucumán abandoned the championship for economic reasons. The first game was played on April 26, 1985, when San Lorenzo de Almagro faced Argentino de Firmat at Estadio Obras Sanitarias.

Ferro Carril Oeste was the first LNB champion after defeating Atenas de Córdoba in 3 games. The next season (1986), Ferro Carril Oeste won its second consecutive title, beating Olimpo de Bahía Blanca in 5 games (3-1 on aggregate). The Verdolaga played its third consecutive final series in 1987, but was finally defeated by Atenas, that won the first of 9 titles, being the most winning LNB team to date.

In 1988 Atenas won a second championship beating River Plate and the next year Ferro won another title, being the only title won by León Najnudel as coach.

Competition format 
Following a system similar to the European basketball leagues, the Liga Nacional features promotion and relegation. Contested by 20 teams, the top division is divided in two stages: the first one consists of a double round-robin competition, with standings decided by a points system. At the end of the season, teams placed 1st to 16th advance to the playoffs, while the last 2 teams play a series to avoid relegation.

The playoffs stage is divided in four parts, where winning teams qualify to the next stage while defeated teams retire from the tournament. The successive stages are quarter finals, semi-finals and the finals. Quarter and semi-finals are played in a 2-2-1 format (best-of-five) while finals are played in a 2-2-1-1-1 format, which rounds are best-of-seven series.

Current teams (2022–23 season)

References

Champions

List of finals

Source: LNB website.

Titles by club

Awards 

These are the yearly individual awards are given by the league as a recognition to the most valuable player (in both, regular season and finals) and the top scorer. Leonardo Gutiérrez was chosen finals MVP a record of 4 times, while Joe Bunn is the most times top scorer (5 seasons).

Statistical leaders

Retired numbers
As of September 2019, 17 players have their jerseys retired. Atenas was the team which started this practice (in 2002, with legendary Marcelo Milanesio's #9).

Notes

References

External links
  
 Pick and Roll (news, info & statistics)  
 Argentinian league on Latinabasket.com
 (news, info & statistics)

 
1985 establishments in Argentina
Nacional
Argentina
Professional sports leagues in Argentina
Sports leagues established in 1985